The Central District of Shaft County is a district (bakhsh) in Shaft County, Gilan Province, Iran. At the 2006 census, its population was 35,319, in 9,193 families.  The District has one city: Shaft. The District has two rural districts (dehestan): Jirdeh Rural District and Molla Sara Rural District.

References 

Shaft County
Districts of Gilan Province